Blandford Street station is a surface-level light rail station on the MBTA's Green Line B branch located in Boston, Massachusetts. The station is located in the center median of Commonwealth Avenue at Silber Way and Blandford Mall, about 2 blocks west of Kenmore Square, near the east end of Boston University. The station consists of two low side platforms, which serve the B branch's two tracks.

Blandford Street is the seventh-busiest surface stop on the B branch, averaging 1,540 boardings per weekday. Although a number of the Green Line surface stops were upgraded with slightly raised platforms around 2003 to allow level boarding on Type 8 low-floor trams, Blandford Street was not among them, and it is not accessible.

History

The Commonwealth Avenue line was originally served by surface streetcars beginning in 1896 as part of what would later become the Green Line A branch. On October 3, 1914, the Boylston Street subway was opened to the Kenmore Portal just east of Kenmore Square, allowing streetcars to enter and run underground into the Tremont Street subway. In October 1932, Kenmore station was built, and the modern Blandford Street Portal was built just east of Blandford Street. 

The name "Blandford Street" for the station is an anachronism, as Blandford Street no longer exists as such. The street, along with Cummington and Hinsdale streets, was bought by Boston University in June 2012 for use as a pedestrian mall. On July 30, 2012, BU closed these roadways to most automobile traffic and renamed Blandford Street as Blandford Mall. However, the station is still named Blandford Street.

Pocket track

A pocket track just west of the station between Blandford Mall and Granby Street is used for several operational purposes. Neither the C nor D branches have similar pocket tracks, so the Blandford Street pocket track is a primary location to store trains on the west end of the Central Subway without blocking revenue service tracks. The pocket track opened on June 30, 1931, replacing a former surface crossover at Kenmore station.

It is frequently used as a layover point for trains during the middle of the day and overnight, and to temporarily store disabled cars. During Red Sox games and other major events at Fenway Park, extra trains are stored on the pocket track to provide extra service from Kenmore to Park Street to handle exiting crowds. An experimental four-car post-game train operated on April 9, 2011 used the track as a staging point. 

The pocket track is also used to short turn westbound service from the central subway, such as when the B branch is not operating due to maintenance, accidents, or weather conditions. Run as Directed (RAD) trains, which provide additional capacity in the subway during peak periods, often operate from Blandford Street. RAD service began on January 1, 1977 and was intensified from July 24, 1982 to September 10, 1982 when the C branch was closed for maintenance. During the closure of the Huntington Avenue subway, beginning December 28, 1985, regular scheduled service was run between Blandford Street and Lechmere. On July 26, 1986 this reverted to RAD service, which was intensified on December 26, 1986 with use of other cutbacks (which, unlike Blandford Street, do not have pocket tracks). RAD service was greatly reduced on September 10, 1988, but increased again from Blandford Street on September 1, 2008.

References

External links

MBTA – Blandford Street
 Station from Blandford Street entrance from Google Maps Street View

Green Line (MBTA) stations
Railway stations in Boston
Railway stations in the United States opened in 1896